"Ring Ring Ring (Ha Ha Hey)" is a song by American hip hop trio De La Soul, released in May 1991 as the lead single from their second album, De La Soul Is Dead (1991). It is a party jam about overzealous fans who pursue the group with demo tapes in their efforts to obtain an endorsement from the group. The song was inspired by one overzealous fan in particular, Breakestra frontman Miles Tackett, who was shopping demo tapes to the group (note "demo tapes by the miles" in the song's subtitle). It was very successful on the charts in Europe, reaching number one in Finland, Greece and Switzerland, as well as on the UK Dance chart. Additionally, the song was a top 10 hit also in Australia, Austria, Belgium, Denmark, Germany, the Netherlands, New Zealand and the UK.

Composition
"Ring Ring Ring (Ha Ha Hey)" has been assumed to have sampled the 1982 Fat Larry's Band song "Act Like You Know", but in fact it samples the 1981 The Whatnauts song "Help Is on the Way", that replays the same bassline as "Act Like You Know".  The chorus of "Ring Ring Ring" uses lyrics and melody from the Curiosity Killed the Cat song "Name and Number". The bass in the introduction comes from Lou Johnson's "Beat" and the drum break is from The Honey Drippers' "Impeach the President". The single version's saxophone is original.

Critical reception
In an retrospective review, Justin Chadwick from Albumism described "Ring Ring Ring (Ha Ha Hey)" as "undeniably irresistible", noting that the song is driven by "astute commentary", "unabashed sarcasm" and a "rousingly rhythmic groove". He complimented the chorus as "memorable", stating that it is a "further testament to De La Soul and Prince Paul's uncanny penchant for merging obscure samples with more familiar fare to craft instantly unforgettable tunes that stick with you." Steve Huey from AllMusic remarked that it "complains about being harassed into listening to lousy demo tapes." 

Upon the release, Larry Flick from Billboard felt that the rap trio "returns with a funk-driven workout that benefits from a cute and contagious chorus—not to mention group's signature clever wordplay." A reviewer from Evening Herald stated that the single "shows that the trio still have the imagination to bring off the big one." Pan-European magazine Music & Media named it one of two "best tracks" of De La Soul Is Dead. Record Mirror said, "Using, of all things, a Curiosity Killed The Cat song for its chorus. Chunky and funky." Miranda Sawyer from Smash Hits gave "Ring Ring Ring (Ha Ha Hey)" six out of ten, adding, "It sounds most pleasant and as usual is chirruped along by an effortless groove and wiggy lyrics, but, well, it's not in the same league as "Eye Know" or "Mama Gave Birth" because there's not enough twiddly bits and that's always a mistake in a rap record." Bob Mack from Spin stated that "the music and delivery are fresh as ever. But the subject matter—a gripe about would-be rappers bugging De La to get their demos signed—seems out of place and a smidge arrogant."

Music video
A black-and-white music video was produced to promote the single, directed by American director Mark Romanek. It features the members of De La Soul and producer Prince Paul in a cameo as an artist trying to hand them his tapes.

Influence
 This song was interpolated on Jaheim's 2009 single, "Ain't Leavin Without You".
 The 2013 Little Mix single "How Ya Doin'?" uses the same lyrics which "Ring Ring Ring" uses.

All 3 songs use the same beat from "Help Is on the Way".

Track listings

 12" maxi, Europe
 "Ring Ring Ring (Ha Ha Hey)" (party line mix) (6:56)
 "Ring Ring Ring (Ha Ha Hey)" (extended decision U.S. mix) (5:15)
 "Ring Ring Ring (Ha Ha Hey)" (piles and piles of demo taped bi-da miles - Conley's decision) (4:05)

 12" maxi, US
 "Ring Ring Ring (Ha Ha Hey)" (extended decision) (5:15)
 "Ring Ring Ring (Ha Ha Hey)" (radio decision) (3:59)
 "Piles And Piles of demo Tapes Bi-Da Miles (Conley's Decision)" (4:05)
 "Afro Connection At A Hi 5 (In The Eyes Of The Hoodlum)" (3:42)

 7" single
 "Ring Ring Ring (Ha Ha Hey)" (Party Line Edit) (4:05)
 "Ring Ring Ring (piles and piles of demo taped bi-da miles - Conley's decision) (4:05)
			
 CD maxi
 "Ring Ring Ring (Ha Ha Hey)" (party line edit) (4:05)
 "Ring Ring Ring (Ha Ha Hey)" (party line mix) (6:56)
 "Ring Ring Ring (Ha Ha Hey)" (extended U.S. mix) (5:15)
 "Ring Ring Ring" (piles and piles of demo taped bi-da miles) (3:35)

 CD maxi / 12" maxi - Remixes
 "Ring Ring Ring (Ha Ha Hey)" (CJ's alternative mix) (5:10)
 "Afro Connection At A Hi 5" (3:42)
 "Ring Ring Ring (Ha Ha Hey)" (sax mix) (5:10)

Official versions
 "Ring Ring Ring (Ha Ha Hey)" (LP Version) (5:06)
 "Ring Ring Ring (Ha Ha Hey)" (Radio Decision) (3:59)
 "Ring Ring Ring (Ha Ha Hey)" (CJ's Alternative Mix) (5:10)
 "Ring Ring Ring (Ha Ha Hey)" (Party Line Edit) (4:05)
 "Ring Ring Ring (Ha Ha Hey)" (Party Line Mix) (6:56)
 "Ring Ring Ring (Ha Ha Hey)" (Extended Decision U.S. Mix) / (Extended Decision Mix) / (Extended U.S. Mix) (5:15)
 "Ring Ring Ring (Ha Ha Hey)" (Piles and Piles of Demo Taped Bi-Da Miles - Conley's Decision) (4:05)
 "Ring Ring Ring (Ha Ha Hey)" (Sax Mix) (5:10)

Charts

Weekly charts

Year-end charts

References

External links

1991 singles
De La Soul songs
Music videos directed by Mark Romanek
Black-and-white music videos
Music Week number-one dance singles
Number-one singles in Finland
Number-one singles in Greece
Number-one singles in Switzerland
Song recordings produced by Prince Paul (producer)
1991 songs
Tommy Boy Records singles
Songs written by David Jude Jolicoeur
Songs written by Vincent Mason
Songs written by Kelvin Mercer
Songs written by Prince Paul (producer)
Songs about telephone calls